Anders (Antti) Tossavainen (11 June 1886, Nilsiä - 20 February 1962) was a Finnish salesperson and politician. He was a member of the Parliament of Finland from 1947 to 1948, representing the Social Democratic Party of Finland (SDP).

References

1886 births
1962 deaths
People from Nilsiä
People from Kuopio Province (Grand Duchy of Finland)
Social Democratic Party of Finland politicians
Members of the Parliament of Finland (1945–48)